The 2013–14 season was Gabala's ninth season as a club and their eighth season in the Azerbaijan Premier League, the top flight of Azerbaijani football. They finished the season in their highest ever position, third, and earned qualification to the UEFA Europa League for the first time in the club's history. They also participated in the Azerbaijan Cup, reaching the final for the first time, where they lost to Neftchi Baku on penalties. It was their first, and only, season with manager Yuri Semin, who mutually terminated his contract at the end of the season. Danijel Subotić was the team's top goalscorer for the season with 13, 12 of which came in the Premier League.

Season review

Pre-season
On 29 May 2013 Yuri Semin was officially unveiled as the club's new manager, appointing recently retired ex-national team goalkeeper Dmitriy Kramarenko as one of his coaches.

Transfers 

The summer transfer window saw a lot of transfer movement from Gabala, with 11 players joining the club and 15 players leaving the club. The most notable departures were January signings Luka Žinko to Hangzhou Greentown and Moustapha Dabo to Kahramanmaraşspor, whilst Ifeanyi Emeghara was released, Jeyhun Sultanov retired and Cristian Pulhac was told he was free to leave the club. 
Aleksandr Chertoganov, Vurğun Hüseynov and Anar Nazirov all joined Sumgayit, whilst Rashad Abdullayev also left the club after one season, joining Baku. Elnar Karimov, Yashar Abuzerov, Rovshan Amiraslanov, Daniel Cruz, Rey Mammadbayli and Amil Yunanov were the other players to leave the club.

Gabala's made their first two signings of the season in May, when Volodimir Levin and Nizami Hajiyev both from Inter Baku. In June Ibrahima Niasse followed from Inter Baku and Dawid Pietrzkiewicz from Simurq, whilst Lorenzo Ebecilio, on loan, and Abdulwaheed Afolabi joined from Metalurh Donetsk and Kuban Krasnodar respectively. Gabala added another three signings in July, with Rail Malikov moving from Denizlispor, Danijel Subotić from Volyn Lutsk and Leonardo from Metalurh Donetsk. Elnur Allahverdiyev signed with Gabala in September on an initial six-month-long loan deal after Rail Malikov was ruled out by injury.

August
Gabala started the season with 2 victories, a 2–1 away victory over Baku on 2 August and a 3–2 home victory Inter Baku on 10 August. Victor Mendy picked up the club's first goals of the season, netting twice in the game against Baku, whilst Leonardo, Volodimir Levin and Ibrahima Niasse all scored their first goals for the club since their summer moves in the victory over Inter Baku. Gabala lost their next games, 2–1 away to Sumgayit and 1–0 at home to Qarabağ, Yannick Kamanan scored Gabala's goal in these two games, and Levin was sent off in the defeat to Sumgayit after picking up two yellow cards. Gabala got back to winning ways in their last game of August, a 2–0 victory over Khazar Lankaran at home on 31 August, with Leonardo scoring his second for the club and Lorenzo Ebecilio his first.

September
After the international break, Gabala traveled to Baku to face AZAL on 15 September, and they picked up their 4th win of the season. AZAL took the lead in the 3rd minute with Will John scoring, but Mendy struck 5 minutes later to level the game. Danijel Subotić, playing his first game for the club after his registration issues were sorted out during the break, scored what turned out to be the winner in the 32nd minute before Amit Guluzade picked up Gabala's second red card of the season for two bookings. Gabala recorded their 5th win, and moved top of the league for the first time in their history, on 20 September, defeating Ravan Baku at home. Subotić scored his second in two appearances in the 8th minute before Levin double the lead 2 minutes later and Leonardo finished off the scoring in the second half. Gabala's last game of September was a 0–0 draw away to Simurq, who played the majority of the game with 10 men following Ilkin Qirtimov's first half red card.

October
Gabala's first game of October was on 4 October at home to Neftchi Baku, and was the last game before the international break. Gabala took the lead in the 7th minute through Lorenzo Ebecilio, before Mahir Shukurov equalised and Rashad Sadiqov scored the winner. On 19 October 2013, Gabala returned from the international break with an away trip to Inter Baku, a game which they won 1-0 thanks to a Danijel Subotić first half goal. Gabala followed this up with another victory on 25 October against Sumgayit, winning the game 2–0 with the goals coming from Danijel Subotić in the first half and Dodô in the second.

November
On 3 November Gabala traveled to face Qarabağ in Baku. Gabala went 4-0 down to Qarabağ, after a Nikoloz Gelashvili brace and goals apiece from Vüqar Nadirov and Chumbinho, before scoring three themselves in 15mins to ensure a close last 5 minutes. Gabala's goals came from Lorenzo Ebecilio, Leonardo and Dodô. Gabala's second game of November was a 0–0 away draw against Khazar Lankaran, which kept them third in the table. On 22 November, Gabala faced AZAL at home, and recorded their 8th win of the season as a second half Leonardo goal gave them a 1–0 win. At the end of November, Oumar Kalabane suffered a meniscus tear at his knee during training and underwent surgery at Acibadem Fulya Hospital. Gabala won their final game of November, a 1–0 away victory over Ravan Baku on 29 November 2013, with the goal coming from Yannick Kamanan.

December
Gabala started December with a 2–1 win over Mil-Muğan in the Azerbaijan Cup, with the goals coming from Leonardo and Abdulwaheed Afolabi, his first goal for the club. Gabala's next game was on 8 December against Simurq, which ended as a 2–1 victory to Gabala after Danijel Subotić scored an injury time winner following his early goal and Amit Guluzade scored an own goal for Simurq. Gabala suffered their fifth defeat of the season on 15 December away to Neftchi Baku. Neftchi took the lead through a 12th minute Araz Abdullayev penalty after Flavinho had been fouled, with Leonardo leveling things up in first half stoppage time from the penalty spot. Mushfig Teymurov was sent off for Gabala after collecting two yellow cards, before Mahir Shukurov scored an injury time free-kick to seal the victory for Neftchi. On 18 December, Diego underwent surgery for a knee injury sustained during training the previous week. Gabala's last game before the winter break, and the last in the first round of 19 matches, was on 20 December at home to Baku. Gabala won the game 2–0 with goals from Danijel Subotić and Lorenzo Ebecilio, two go 2nd in the table.

January transfers
On 23 December, it was announced that Gabala had signed Ruslan Tagizade from AZAL on a two-year contract, whilst defenders Shahriyar Khalilov and Dejan Kelhar all left the club and Tarzin Jahangirov joined Simurq on loan. On 30 December 2013, Gabala announced that they had agreed to sign Rafael Santos, who left Arsenal Kyiv following their bankruptcy in November, on a two-year contract subject to completing medical. On 6 January 2014, Santos completed his move to Gabala. On 8 January, Elnur Allahverdiyev made his move to Gabala permanent, signing a one-year deal. On 13 January, Anar Nazirov resigned for Gabala from Sumgayit on a one-year contract. On 26 January, Gabala revealed that Davron Ergashev had signed on a six-month contract from Zhetysu following a successful trial period. It also came to light that Cristian Pulhac was still at the club after refusing to terminate his contract and was currently training with the youth team. On 31 January, Gabala signed Marat Izmailov on a six-month loan deal from F.C. Porto, and Kamran Agayev from Baku on an 18-month contract.

February
Gabala's first game of the 2014  was on 2 February away to Sumgayit, which they won 3-0 thanks to goals from Victor Mendy, Lorenzo Ebecilio and Leonardo, to return to the top of the league. On 8 February Gabala dropped off the top of the table after a 0–1 home defeat to Qarabağ, this was followed up with another defeat on 15 February at home to Khazar Lankaran. Gabala got back to winning ways on 19 February despite going 1-0 down to a Nedo Turkovic penalty before Danijel Subotić scored his tenth of the season and a Shahriyar Rahimov gave Gabala a 2–1 away win over AZAL. Gabala's next two games were 0-0 draws against Ravan Baku and Simurq.

March
On 9 March Gabala faced Neftchi Baku at home in a game that ended 1–2 to Neftchi, with Gabala's goal coming from Lorenzo Ebecilio. Gabala's next game was a 0–0 draw on 12 March against Qarabağ in the Cup, before they drew 1–1 against FK Baku 4 days later in the league. Gabala progressed to the Semi-Finals of the cup on 19 March winning 2–1 in the second leg of their Quarter-Final match against Qarabağ, thanks to goals from Danijel Subotić and Victor Mendy. On 23 March Gabala were beaten 4–1 at home by Inter Baku, Victor Mendy scoring their only goal whilst they slipped out of the European places for the first time since week 5 of the season. On 25 March 2014, Bakhshiev announced that he would be retiring at the end of the 2013–14 season. Gabala suffered their second defeat in a row, and third in four games, on 30 March, losing 3–0 away to Qarabağ in a game that saw Elnur Allahverdiyev sent off.

April
Gabala lost their first game of April, going down 1–0 away to Khazar Lankaran on 5 April. Gabala's next game was on 12 April, which they drew 0–0 at home to AZAL to earn only their 4th point in eight games. On 15 April Sumin released Yannick Kamanan from his contract that was due to expire at the end of the season. The next day Gabala defeated Khazar Lankaran 3–0 in the first leg of their Azerbaijan Cup Semi-final, with Nizami Hajiyev scoring a bracing and Victor Mendy scoring the other. Gabala followed that win up with a 2–1 away victory over Ravan Baku on 20 April, Mendy scoring again with Gabalas other goal coming from Urfan Abbasov, his first for the club. Gabala went on to seal a place in the Azerbaijan Cup Final on 24 April, with a 1–1 draw in the second leg of against Khazar Lankaran, after Mendy scored his third goal in three games. Gabala's last game of April was a 1–0 home win over Simurq on the 27th, Dodô grabbing the only goal.

May
Gabala started May as they finished April, with a 2–1 away victory over Neftchi Baku. Javid Imamverdiyev gave Neftchi the lead in the 50th minute, with Dodô equalising in the 62nd minute before Lorenzo Ebecilio scored the winner in the 90th minute, and getting sent off for two yellow cards in stoppage time. On 7 May Gabala beat Baku 3–1 to go back into 3rd in the table. The goals came from Marat Izmailov, Mushfig Teymurov and Danijel Subotić, with Izmailov's and Teymurov's goals being their first for the club. Gabala drew their penultimate league game on 12 May against Inter Baku 0-0. On the last day of the League season, Gabala started in fourth place, 1 point behind Neftchi Baku. Gabala came from behind to beat Sumgayit 3–1, Magomed Kurbanov scoring for Sumgayit before Victor Mendy, Lorenzo Ebecilio and Abdulwaheed Afolabi scored to give Gabala the win that moved them into third place after Neftchi Baku drew 0–0 at Simurq.
Gabala finished the season by playing in the Azerbaijan Cup Final against Neftchi Baku. Marat Izmailov scored Gabala's only goal to cancel out Samir Masimovs early strike to send the game into extra-time, and then to penalties, of which Gabala missed three of their five and Neftchi scored three of their four.

Transfers

Summer

In:

 
 

 
 

 

Out:

Winter

In:

 
 

Out:

Squad

Competitions

Friendlies

Azerbaijan Premier League

Results summary

Results by round

Results

League table

Azerbaijan Cup

Squad statistics

Appearances and goals

|-
|colspan="14"|Players away from Gabala on loan:

|-
|colspan="14"|Players who appeared for Gabala no longer at the club:

|}

Goal scorers

Disciplinary Record

Notes 

Qarabağ have played their home games at the Tofiq Bahramov Stadium since 1993 due to the ongoing situation in Quzanlı.

References

External links 
Gabala FC Website
Gabala FC at UEFA.com
Gabala FC at Soccerway.com
Gabala FC at National Football Teams.com

Gabala FC seasons
Gabala